Muriel Dodd (31 May 1891 – 21 December 1976) was an English amateur golfer. She held the British and Canadian titles in 1913.

Dodd was the winner of the 1913 British Ladies Amateur held at the Royal Lytham & St Annes Golf Club, taking the title from Gladys Ravenscroft. She also won the Canadian Women's Amateur in 1913. In 1913 U.S. Women's Amateur in Wilmington, Delaware, she lost to Gladys Ravenscroft in the semi-finals.

Dodd married Lieutenant Allan Macbeth at All Soul's Church in London in May 1916. She died in Surrey in December 1976 at the age of 85.

References

Amateur golfers
English female golfers
Winners of ladies' major amateur golf championships
1891 births
1976 deaths